Haydenville is an unincorporated community and census-designated place (CDP) in southern Green Township, Hocking County, Ohio, United States. As of the 2010 census the population of the CDP was 381.

History

Haydenville was founded in 1852. The community was named for Peter Hayden, the original owner of the town site. A post office has been in operation at Haydenville since 1870.

Haydenville was the last entirely owned company town in Ohio, the company owned every house and both stores in town. You were paid in script that you could only spend at the company store. You couldn't live there unless you worked there, if you lost your job, you also lost "your" home. Other stores were not allowed to open up in town. Only in the early 1960s were workers allowed to purchase their homes from the company.

In 1973, the community was listed on the National Register of Historic Places as a historic district under the name of "Haydenville Historic Town." Over 120 contributing properties were included in the historic district's .

Geography
Haydenville lies along the Hocking River near U.S. Route 33, southeast of the city of Logan, the county seat of Hocking County. While most of the CDP is within Green Township, the community extends south into Starr Township. Although Haydenville is unincorporated, it has a post office, and a nearby cemetery. Its ZIP code is 43127.

References

Further reading

Populated places established in 1870
Historic districts on the National Register of Historic Places in Ohio
Census-designated places in Hocking County, Ohio
National Register of Historic Places in Hocking County, Ohio
Coal towns in Ohio
Populated places on the National Register of Historic Places in Ohio
1870 establishments in Ohio